For Alimony Only is a 1926 American silent drama film directed by William C. deMille and starring Leatrice Joy, Clive Brook, and Lilyan Tashman.

The film's sets were by the art director Max Parker while the costumes were designed by Adrian, later known for his work at MGM.

Cast
 Leatrice Joy as Mary Martin Williams 
 Clive Brook as Peter Williams 
 Lilyan Tashman as Narcissa Williams 
 Casson Ferguson as Bertie Waring 
 Toby Claude as The Maid 
 André Cheron as Shop Manager 
 Harry Semels as Cop 
 Florence Wix as Christmas Party Guest

Production
Leatrice Joy had impulsively cut her hair short in 1926, and Cecil B. DeMille, whom Joy had followed when he set up Producers Distributing Corporation, was publicly angry as it prevented her from portraying traditional feminine roles. The studio developed projects with roles suitable for her “Leatrice Joy bob”, and For Alimony Only was the fourth of five films before she regrew her hair. Despite this, a professional dispute would end the Joy / Demille partnership in 1928.

Preservation
A copy of For Alimony Only is preserved film at the UCLA Film and Television Archive.

References

Bibliography
Donald W. McCaffrey & Christopher P. Jacobs. Guide to the Silent Years of American Cinema. Greenwood Publishing, 1999.

External links

1926 films
1926 drama films
1920s English-language films
American silent feature films
Silent American drama films
Films directed by William C. deMille
American black-and-white films
Producers Distributing Corporation films
1920s American films